Bajram Fraholli (born 14 September 1968 in Qyteti Stalin) is a former Albanian footballer who played as a left sided midfielder.

International career
He made his debut for Albania in a November 1996 FIFA World Cup qualification match against Armenia in Tirana and earned a total of 2 caps, scoring 1 goal. His final international was a December 1996 World Cup qualification match against Northern Ireland.

Honours
Albanian Superliga: 1
 1994

References

External links

1968 births
Living people
Footballers from Durrës
Albanian footballers
Association football midfielders
Albania international footballers
KF Naftëtari Kuçovë players
KS Pogradeci players
KF Teuta Durrës players
Besa Kavajë players
KS Lushnja players
Albanian football managers
Naftëtari Kuçovë managers